Ida Vesper, also spelled Idavesper is an unincorporated community in Chattahoochee County, Georgia.

History
A post office was established in 1890 with the name Idavesper, and was later disestablished in 1903.

References

Populated places in Chattahoochee County, Georgia
Unincorporated communities in Georgia (U.S. state)